The Tri-County Conference (not to be confused with the conference of the same name located in the northern or western portions of the state) was located in Jefferson, Jennings, and Ripley counties in the southeastern part of Indiana. Originally the Jennings County Conference, when the Laughery Valley Conference was formed, it left Ripley County without enough schools to continue their county league, and the remaining schools were absorbed into the rebranded Jennings-Ripley County Conference in 1941. With many smaller schools in the area continuing to be consolidated into their slightly larger neighbors, both the JRCC and Jefferson County Conference continued to shrink in size. When one JCC school left to join the Ohio River Valley Conference in 1952, the remaining JCC schools joined with the JRCC under the Tri-County moniker. Consolidation and defections to other conferences continued to plague the league, with all of the Jennings County schools gone by 1961. The conference struggled on for five more years, until three of the remaining four schools in the league consolidated, leaving only Holton. Holton would continue as an independent for another three years, until being absorbed by South Ripley High School in 1969.

Membership

 Lions before 1940.

Resources
 Ripley County Basketball HOF Class of 2005

Indiana high school athletic conferences
High school sports conferences and leagues in the United States
Indiana High School Athletic Association disestablished conferences